The Mount Lemmon Marathon were a pair of separate road race marathon events that took place in the Santa Catalina Mountains near the city of Tucson, Arizona, United States. The initial race, which was in the uphill direction, was held between 2010 and 2013.   The uphill race started near the desert floor and ended at the village of Summerhaven near the top of Mount Lemmon.

Between 2017 and 2019, the second iteration of the race ran in the downhill direction from Summerhaven down to the desert floor.

Local television station KVOA described the uphill race as "the only long-distance uphill race in the U.S". It had been described as the most difficult road marathon in the world.

The downhill marathon and half-marathon on Mount Lemmon was initiated by the Revel Racing Series in November, 2017.   The race attracted a moderate number of participants during its three years of operation.   In 2017, there were 276 finishers in the full marathon and 429 finishers in the half marathon.   In 2018, there were 461 finishers in the full marathon and 719 finishers in the half marathon.   In 2019, there were 421 finishers in the full marathon and 700 finishers in the half marathon.

The Revel Racing Series elected to retire the Mount Lemmon downhill races after the 2019 event.   It is not scheduled again.

References

External links
Mount Lemmon Marathon Official site (last managed by Revel Racing Series)
Mount Lemmon Marathon Elevation Profile

Marathons in the United States